Camelini is a tribe of terrestrial herbivores in the family Camelidae, endemic to Asia, North America, and Africa from the Late Eocene to the present. It includes the living genus Camelus as the type genus. At least one genus, Eulamaops, reached South America.

Genera

References

Camelids
Pliocene even-toed ungulates
Pleistocene even-toed ungulates
Mammal tribes
Extant Eocene first appearances